Deans Creek may refer to the following:

 Deans Creek (Marshall Creek tributary), a river in California
 Deans Creek, a cove on Deer Island, New Brunswick
 Deans Creek (Oriskany Creek tributary), a river in New York
 Deans Creek (Carolina Creek tributary), a river in Texas

See also 
 Dean Creek (disambiguation)